The Pemigewasset Valley Railroad was a railroad connecting Plymouth to North Woodstock, New Hampshire, United States. Funded by the Boston, Concord and Montreal Railroad, it was only independent for one month after construction before being permanently "leased" by the BC&M.

References

Transportation in Grafton County, New Hampshire
Defunct New Hampshire railroads
Predecessors of the Boston and Maine Railroad